Would I Lie to You? (informally abbreviated as WILTY; also known as Would I Lie to You? Australia) is an Australian comedy panel game show based on the British game show of the same name. It premiered on Network 10 on 28 February 2022. In September 2022, it was announced that the show had been renewed for a second series which would premiere in 2023, with Charlie Pickering replacing comedian Chris Taylor as a regular team captain.

Format

Rounds
In all rounds, the scoring system is the same: teams gain a point for correctly guessing whether a statement is true or not, but if they guess incorrectly the opposing team gets a point. Some questions are edited out during post-production, however the scores were re-recorded to reflect only the questions which had made the edit and not the whole recording.

Current rounds
"Home Truths": Panellists read out a statement from a card about themselves. The opposing team has to decide whether it is true or false by asking the panellist questions. 
"This is My...": A guest comes onto the set and is introduced by first name, but remains standing in silence as the round continues. Panellists on one team tell the opposing team about their relationship to the guest; only one account out of three told is genuine, and the opposing team has to work out which it is. At the end of the round, the guest reveals their true identity, and which of the panellists they have a genuine relationship with.
"Quick-Fire Lies": Panellists are chosen at random, and read a statement about themselves from a card. This is identical to "Home Truths" in practice.
"Could it Be?": Chrissie reads out a statement for each team and they have determine whether it is a truth or a lie.

Former rounds
"Possession": Panellists take an item out of a box and read a statement from a card, and have to convince the opposing team that the possession genuinely belongs to them.

Cast

Guest appearances
The following have all appeared multiple times as one of the guest panellists on the show.

2 appearances
Dave Hughes
Lloyd Langford
Luke McGregor
Ross Noble

Episodes
The coloured backgrounds denote the result of each of the shows or series:
 – indicates Chris' or Charlie's team won the game or the series.
 – indicates Frank's team won the game or the series.
 – indicates the game or the series ended in a draw.
Bold type – indicates Chrissie's individual liar of the week.

Series overview

Series 1 (2022)

Series 2 (2023)

Notes

Scores

See also
Would I Lie to You?
Would You Believe?
To Tell the Truth

References

External links

2022 Australian television series debuts
2020s Australian comedy television series
Australian panel games
2020s Australian game shows
Network 10 original programming
Television series by Endemol Australia
English-language television shows
Television shows set in Melbourne
Australian television series based on British television series